The 47th Saturn Awards, officially known as the 50th Anniversary Saturn Awards to celebrate the 50 years of the Saturn Awards (created in 1972), presented by the Academy of Science Fiction, Fantasy and Horror Films and honoring the best in science fiction, fantasy, horror, and other genres belonging to genre fiction in film, television, and home entertainment, were held on October 25, 2022 and was live-streamed on ElectricNOW. The eligibility period spanned almost two years this time around. The nominations were announced on August 12, 2022.

For the first time since the 45th Saturn Awards of 2019, this ceremony marked the revival (and expansion) of the television categories (programs and acting) being split into two different sets of categories: "Network / Cable" and "Streaming". For streaming services, Disney+ received the most nominations with 26 (10 for the Star Wars universe and 16 for the Marvel Cinematic Universe), followed by Netflix with 17, while AMC dominated the nominations for network / cable also with 17.

The Batman led the nominations for film with twelve, including Best Superhero Film and four acting nominations, followed by Nightmare Alley with ten and Spider-Man: No Way Home with nine. For network / cable television, Better Call Saul (AMC) led the nominations with seven, followed by Superman & Lois (The CW) and The Walking Dead (AMC) with six each. Severance (Apple TV+) and Stranger Things (Netflix) led the nominations for streaming television with six apiece, followed by Obi-Wan Kenobi (Disney+) with five mentions.

Category changes

Introduced
 Best Guest-Starring Performance in a Streaming Television Series
 Best Performance by a Younger Actor in a Streaming Television Series
 Best Guest-Starring Performance in a Network or Cable Television Series
 Best Performance by a Younger Actor in a Network or Cable Television Series

Revived
 Best Actor in a Streaming Television Series
 Best Actress in a Streaming Television Series
 Best Streaming Horror / Thriller Television Series
 Best Supporting Actor in a Streaming Television Series
 Best Supporting Actress in a Streaming Television Series

Discontinued
 Best Superhero Television Series
 Best Guest Starring Role on Television
 Best Performance by a Younger Actor in a Television Series

Winners and nominees

Film

Television

Programs

Acting

Home entertainment

Special awards
 Life Career Award – Kathryn Leigh Scott
 Producer's Showcase Award – Geoff Johns
 Breakthrough Performance Award – Amber Midthunder (Prey)
 Dan Curtis Legacy Award – Julie Plec
 Robert Forster Artist's Award – The Ensemble Cast of Better Call Saul

Multiple nominations

Multiple wins

References

External links
 Official Saturn Awards website

Saturn Awards ceremonies
2021 film awards
2022 film awards
2022 in California
2021 television awards
2022 television awards
2021 in American cinema
2022 in American cinema
2022 awards in the United States